George Murgatroyd Woodward (1765–1809) was an English caricaturist and humor writer. He was a friend and drinking companion of Thomas Rowlandson.

Biography
Woodward was born in Stanton Hall, in Stanton by Dale in Derbyshire, England the son of William Woodward in 1765.
Nicknamed Mustard George, Woodward had a somewhat crude but energetic style. Widely published in “The Caricature Magazine” and elsewhere, his drawings were nearly all etched by others, primarily Thomas Rowlandson, but also Charles Williams, Isaac Cruikshank, Piercy Roberts and others.

Dorothy George wrote of him "He makes a very considerable figure in caricature ; he was original, prolific, 
and varied.". The George Woodward Archive  in the Derbyshire Record Office in Matlock, Derbyshire  has a large collection of his works. Many of his Prints are described in the  Catalogue of Political and Personal Satires Preserved in the Department of Prints and Drawings in the British Museum.  The most complete catalogue of his works can be found in A Catalogue of the Books, Drawings, Prints and Periodicals forming the William A. Gordon Library of British Caricature.

Works
 Eccentric Excursions in England and South Wales (1796) (sc Isaac Cruikshank)
 Cupids Magick Lantern (1797–78) (sc Thomas Rowlandson, published by Hooper & Wigstead)
 Matrimonial Comforts (1799) (sc Thomas Rowlandson)
 Country Characters (1800) (sc Thomas Rowlandson), published by Rudolph Ackermann)
 Horse accomplishments (1799) (sc Thomas Rowlandson, published by Rudolph Ackermann)
 Le Brun Travestied or Caricatures of the Passions (1800) (sc Thomas Rowlandson, published by Rudolph Ackermann)
 Grotesque Borders for Rooms and Halls (1799–1800) (sc Thomas Rowlandson, published by Rudolph Ackermann)
 Pigmy Revels (1800–1) (sc Francis Sansom, published by S. W. Fores)
 An Olio of Good Breeding (1801) (sc Isaac Cruikshank)
 The Musical Mania for the Year 1802 
 Attempts at Humour (1803)
 The Bettyad (1805)
 The Caricature Magazine or Hudibrastic Mirror (1806–7) (sc Thomas Rowlandson, Isaac Cruikshank, and others, published by Thomas Tegg)
 An Essay on the Art of Ingeniously Tormenting (1808) (sc Thomas Rowlandson)
 Chesterfield Travestied, or School for Modern manners (1808) (sc Thomas Rowlandson)
 The Fugitive and Other Literary Works (1805)

See also
 Rudolf Ackermann
 Thomas Rowlandson
 Thomas Tegg

Sources

External links
 
 George Moutard Woodward (British Museum Bio)

1765 births
1809 deaths
Artists from London
18th-century engravers
19th-century engravers
British engravers
British illustrators
English illustrators
English cartoonists
English humorists
English caricaturists
People from the Borough of Erewash